Amazone zu Pferde may refer to:

 Amazone zu Pferde (Kiss), a sculpture by August Kiss
 Amazone zu Pferde (Tuaillon), a sculpture by Louis Tuaillon